Giovanni de Copis (died 1527) was a Roman Catholic prelate who served as Bishop of Terracina, Priverno e Sezze (1522–1527).

Biography
On 29 October 1522, Giovanni de Copis was appointed during the papacy of Pope Adrian VI as Bishop of Terracina, Priverno e Sezze.
He served as Bishop of Terracina, Priverno e Sezze until his death on 15 August 1527.

References

External links and additional sources
 (for Chronology of Bishops) 
 (for Chronology of Bishops) 

16th-century Italian Roman Catholic bishops
Bishops appointed by Pope Adrian VI
1527 deaths